The 1994 NCAA Division II football season, part of college football in the United States organized by the National Collegiate Athletic Association at the Division II level, began on September 3, 1994, and concluded with the NCAA Division II Football Championship on December 10, 1994, at Braly Municipal Stadium in Florence, Alabama, hosted by the University of North Alabama.

North Alabama defeated Texas A&M–Kingsville in the championship game, 16–10, to win their second consecutive Division II national title.

The Harlon Hill Trophy was awarded to Chris Hatcher, quarterback from Valdosta State.

Conference changes and new programs

Conference standings

Conference summaries

Postseason

The 1994 NCAA Division II Football Championship playoffs were the 22nd single-elimination tournament to determine the national champion of men's NCAA Division II college football. The championship game was held at Braly Municipal Stadium in Florence, Alabama, for the ninth time.

Playoff bracket

See also
1994 NCAA Division I-A football season
1994 NCAA Division I-AA football season
1994 NCAA Division III football season
1994 NAIA Division I football season
1994 NAIA Division II football season

References